"If I Had a Rocket Launcher" is a song by Canadian singer-songwriter Bruce Cockburn, from his 1984 album Stealing Fire.

The song was inspired by Cockburn's visit, sponsored by Oxfam, to Guatemalan refugee camps in Mexico following the counterinsurgency campaign of dictator Efraín Ríos Montt. Although Cockburn had occasionally touched on political themes in his earlier songs, "If I Had a Rocket Launcher" was his first explicitly political song to be released as a single, and earned him a new reputation as an outspoken musical activist.

In the song, Cockburn despairs of waiting for a political solution to the crisis, and expresses the desire to take matters into his own hands. Each verse ends with a line stating what Cockburn would do if he had a rocket launcher: in the first verse, "I'd make somebody pay". In the second, "I would retaliate". In the third, "I would not hesitate". The fourth and final verse ends with the song's most famous and controversial lyric: "If I had a rocket launcher, some son-of-a-bitch would die".

In a later interview, Cockburn stated that the song "is not a call to arms; this is a cry."

In 2009, Cockburn performed the song for Canadian troops in Afghanistan; he was subsequently presented (temporarily) with a rocket launcher.

Chart performance
Although the song received considerable airplay on Canadian radio in early 1985, many radio stations played an edited version which faded out before the "son-of-a-bitch" lyric was heard. The song failed to reach the national Top 40, peaking at No. 49 on the Canadian charts in the week of 9 March 1985. It did, however, reach the Top 40 in some individual markets – for example, it peaked at No. 24 on the CHUM Chart in Toronto.

The song also reached No. 88 on the Billboard Hot 100 charts in the United States. It was Cockburn's only single besides "Wondering Where the Lions Are" to reach the Top 100 in that country.

Other notes
The song was covered by Cottage Industry on the 1991 Bruce Cockburn tribute album Kick at the Darkness.

During their Maybe You Should Drive tour, Barenaked Ladies often inserted the "some son-of-a-bitch would die" lyric into their own song "If I Had $1000000".

Following their album Rattle and Hum, U2 reportedly rehearsed the song a number of times with the intention to record a cover, although this never materialized.

References

1984 songs
True North Records singles
A&M Records singles
Songs written by Bruce Cockburn
Protest songs
Bruce Cockburn songs
Songs based on actual events
Songs about Guatemala
Anti-war songs